Werner Daehn (born 14 October 1967) is a German actor, who has worked with Vin Diesel and Samuel L. Jackson in XXX, with Jason Priestley in Colditz an ITV1 2005 miniseries, with Bill Pullman in Revelations and with Steven Seagal in Shadow Man. He has also worked in German productions like Stauffenberg - Rebellion of Conscience (also titled Valkeryie on the German DVD) and King of Thieves (nominated in Germany for the Grimme Prize). He appears momentarily in the film The Lives of Others by Florian Henckel von Donnersmarck. He also took part in a British production for the BBC, when in 2011 he played the role of Dr Georg Maurer, the German doctor who treated the Manchester United players who survived the 1958 Munich air disaster. In 2016, he played the role of Josef Von Zimmerman, in Game of Aces. In 2014 he played the role of Timo Lemke in Tatort: Der Maulwurf which was then aired on the Das Erste channel.

Partial filmography
 1996  as Wanja
 2001 Enemy at the Gates as Politruk
 2002 XXX as Kirill
 2004 King of Thieves as Mucki
 2004 Stauffenberg (TV Movie) as Sturmbannführer Trabener Straße (uncredited)
 2005 Revelations (TV Mini-Series) as Asteroth
 2006 The Lives of Others as Einsatzleiter In Uniform
 2007 The Counterfeiters as Rosenthal
 2008 Speed Racer as Sempre Fi-Ber Leader
 2008 Valkyrie as Major Ernst John Von Freyend
 2010 Zeiten ändern Dich as Zivilpolizist
 2010 Kajínek as Perner
 2011 Die Superbullen - Sie kennen keine Gnade as Thilo
 2011 United as Professor Maurer
 2011 Pariser Platz - Berlin as Ralf
 2011 The Big Black as Humphrey
 2012 Alex Cross as Erich Nunemacher
 2013 Field of Lost Shoes as Yuri
 2014 Der Tropfen - Ein Roadmovie as Verfassungsschtzer
 2014 The Silent Mountain as Sven Kornatz
 2014 Allies as Captain Dekker
 2015 Field of Lost Shoes as General Franz Sigel
 2015 Le bureau des légendes as FSB Officer Vlad
 2016 Mann im Spagat: Pace, Cowboy, Pace as Pfleger
 2016 Game of Aces as Josef Von Zimmermann
 2017 Tom of Finland as Müller
 2017 Das schaffen wir schon as Putin
 2018 Das letzte Mahl as Siegmund Loewe
 2018 Wilkolak as SS Soldier
 2019 The Operative as Röska

References

External links

1965 births
Living people
People from Worms, Germany
German male film actors